Va banque is a 1920 German silent drama film directed by Léo Lasko and starring Fritz Kortner, Edith Meller and Meinhart Maur. It premiered at the Marmorhaus in Berlin.

The film's sets were designed by the art directors Robert A. Dietrich and Robert Neppach.

Cast
 Fritz Kortner as S. M. Wulff
 Edith Meller as Hella
 Meinhart Maur as Krojanker
 Charles Willy Kayser as Herbert von Hochberg
 Erich Pabst as Kammerdiener Aristid
 Niels Prien as Prinz Isenburg
 Gerhard Ritterband as Piccolo Fritz
 Fritz Beckmann as Buchmacher Korn
 Paul Biensfeldt
 Hugo Flink

References

Bibliography
 Bock, Hans-Michael & Bergfelder, Tim. The Concise CineGraph. Encyclopedia of German Cinema. Berghahn Books, 2009.

External links

1920 films
Films of the Weimar Republic
German silent feature films
Films directed by Léo Lasko
German black-and-white films
UFA GmbH films
1920s German films
Silent drama films
German drama films